In mathematics, a Lagrangian system is a pair , consisting of a smooth fiber bundle  and a Lagrangian density , which yields the Euler–Lagrange differential operator acting on sections of .

In classical mechanics, many dynamical systems are Lagrangian systems. The configuration space of such a Lagrangian system is a fiber bundle  over the time axis . In particular,  if a reference frame is fixed. In classical field theory, all field systems are the Lagrangian ones.

Lagrangians and Euler–Lagrange operators 

In coordinates 
Given bundle coordinates  on a fiber bundle  and the adapted coordinates ,) on jet manifolds , a Lagrangian  and its Euler–Lagrange operator read

 

 

where

 

denote the total derivatives.

For instance, a first-order Lagrangian and its second-order Euler–Lagrange operator take the form

Euler–Lagrange equations 
The kernel of an Euler–Lagrange operator provides the Euler–Lagrange equations .

Cohomology and Noether's theorems
Cohomology of the variational bicomplex leads to the so-called
variational formula

 

where

 

Noether's first theorem and Noether's second theorem are corollaries of this variational formula.

Graded manifolds 
Extended to graded manifolds, the variational bicomplex provides description of graded Lagrangian systems of even and odd variables.

Alternative formulations 
In a different way, Lagrangians, Euler–Lagrange operators and Euler–Lagrange equations are introduced in the framework of the calculus of variations.

Classical mechanics 
A solution of the equations of motion is called a motion.

See also 
Lagrangian mechanics 
Calculus of variations 
Noether's theorem
Noether identities
Jet bundle
Jet (mathematics)
Variational bicomplex

References

External links 

Differential operators
Calculus of variations
Dynamical systems
Lagrangian mechanics